XERED-AM is a radio station in Mexico City. Located on 1110 kHz, XERED-AM is owned by Grupo Radio Centro. 1110 AM is a United States clear-channel frequency.

History
The concession history for XERED-AM begins with XEFO, a radio station launched on December 30, 1930 on 940 kHz as the radio station of the National Revolutionary Party (later the PRI). The earliest available concession for XEFO dates to July 1, 1932. Despite the ban on political use of radio stations, XEFO radio was used as a method of disseminating party ideology, government accomplishments and as the chief medium of broadcasting news and propaganda during Lázaro Cárdenas's 1934 presidential election. XEFO was also relayed on shortwave XEUZ, which broadcast on 6120 kHz with 5 kW. Not long after Cárdenas was replaced by Miguel Alemán, XEFO was sold in 1941 to Francisco Aguirre Jiménez, who changed the callsign to XEQR-AM and used it to launch what became Grupo Radio Centro—which would end up buying Radio Red in 1994. However, XEQR was launched on a separate concession.

In 1946, a new station on 1110 kHz was established, XERCN-AM, owned by Rafael Cutberto Navarro through concessionaire Radio Central de México, S.A., with the concession history of XEFO. In 1973, it was sold to Clemente Serna Martínez and his Radio Programas de México, who the next year launched a new format for the station, "Radio Red". The callsign was changed to XERED-AM and the station began pioneering longform news and talk programming. Radio Red's flagship newscast was Monitor, which started on September 2, 1974, and whose morning edition was hosted by José Gutiérrez Vivó. Also in the 1970s, the station launched an FM sister station, XHRED-FM 88.1. Monitor grew to have four daily editions (morning, noon, evening and midnight) and became Mexico City's top-rated radio newscast by the late 1980s.

In 1994, RPM/Radiodifusora Red—which, by this point, had grown to include XERED-AM, XHRED-FM, and XHRCA-FM 91.3 in Mexico City, as well as Radio Red repeaters in Guadalajara (XEDKR-AM 700) and Monterrey (XESTN-AM 1540), was sold to Grupo Radio Centro. After the sale, Gutiérrez Vivó created Infored, which remained in charge of producing Monitor and other news programming, while all of XERED's other talk programs and hosts became part of Radio Centro.

For media concentration reasons, Radio Centro sold two stations (1320 AM, which became XENET-AM, and 1560 AM, which became XEINFO-AM) to Infored in 1998, with the stations relaunched in 2000. After a legal conflict between the two sides that culminated in a lawsuit won by Infored, in 2004 the Monitor newscasts were removed from Radio Red after almost 30 years on air (they continued on 1320 and 1560 AM until 2008). Radio Centro responded by increasing XERED's daytime power to 100 kW from 50 and replacing Monitor with their own news offerings.

In 2017, citing "changes in AM transmission infrastructure", Grupo Radio Centro reorganized all of its AM radio stations, shutting down several and consolidating their programs. Formato 21's news wheel format moved from XERC-AM 790 to 1110 AM, which continued to carry the La Red de Radio Red newscasts. Most of XERED's non-news programs moved to XHFO-FM.

On January 18, 2019, at 9pm, XERED went off the air due to a transmitter relocation, with their news and talk programming now only being available as an online-only stream (with classical music playing when no talk programs were scheduled). The Formato 21 newswheel format was rebranded as "Radio Centro Noticias" and moved to XERC-FM beginning on February 1, but ultimately disappeared at the end of the year.

On August 8, 2019, the station's talk programming was combined with that of XEQR-AM in a single online stream under the latter's "Radio Centro 1030" banner, ending, for now, the use of the "Radio Red" name. The stream was shut down on May 15, 2020.

On September 9, 2021, the Federal Telecommunications Institute authorized GRC to relocate XERED-AM to the transmitter site of XEMP-AM and XEQK-AM, owned by the Instituto Mexicano de la Radio. In June 2022, XERED returned to the air intermittently after a 41-month absence, broadcasting Universal Stereo Online programming as a test signal. On July 4, it formally resumed broasdcasting as a full simulcast of XHRED-FM "Universal", although with XHRED's advertising replaced with PSAs and cultural interstitials similar to those previously aired on Radio Red.

References

External links

Radio stations established in 1930
Radio stations in Mexico City
Radio stations in the State of Mexico